Two ships of the Royal Navy have borne the name HMS Eastbourne, after the East Sussex seaside town of Eastbourne:

 was a  launched in 1940 and sold in 1948.
 was a  launched in 1955 and sold for scrapping in 1985.

Royal Navy ship names